The 1997 Barber Dodge Pro Series season was the twelfth season of the series. All drivers used Dodge powered Goodyear shod Mondiale chassis. This was the final season the series used the Mondiale chassis and Goodyear tires.

Race calendar and results

Final standings

References

Barber Dodge Pro Series
Barber Dodge